Dorothee Deuring (born on 27 June 1968 in Sank. Gallen) is an Austrian sport shooter. She competed in rifle shooting events at the 1988 Summer Olympics. Deuring attended the University of South Florida.

Olympic results

References

1968 births
Living people
ISSF rifle shooters
Austrian female sport shooters
Shooters at the 1988 Summer Olympics
Olympic shooters of Austria
Sportspeople from St. Gallen (city)

University of South Florida alumni
University of South Florida olympians
20th-century Austrian women